My Son John may refer to:

 My Son John, a 1952 American drama film
 An Irish folk song, also known as "Mrs. McGrath"
 Diddle, Diddle, Dumpling, My Son John, a nursery rhyme

See also
 My Son Johnny, a 1991 American television drama film